Year 763 (DCCLXIII) was a common year starting on Saturday (link will display the full calendar) of the Julian calendar. The denomination 763 for this year has been used since the early medieval period, when the Anno Domini calendar era became the prevalent method in Europe for naming years.

Events 
 By place 

 Byzantine Empire 
 June – Battle of Anchialus: Emperor Constantine V sends a Byzantine expeditionary force (800 ships and 9,600 cavalry) to Thrace, to defend the fortress city of Anchialus on the Black Sea Coast. Meanwhile, Telets, ruler (khagan) of the Bulgarian Empire, blocks the mountain passes and takes positions on the heights near Anchialus. During a desperate cavalry charge, the Bulgars are defeated and many are captured; Telets manages to escape. Constantine enters Constantinople in triumph, and kills all the prisoners.

 Europe 
 August – Byzantine troops invade the Papal States, in alliance with King Desiderius of the Lombards. King Pepin III ("the Short") intervenes, and begins negotiations between the Lombards and Pope Paul I. Desiderius promises to end the hostilities, but on condition that Pepin sends back Lombard hostages held by the Franks. 

 Britain 
 Ciniod I succeeds Bridei V, as king of the Picts (modern Scotland).

 Abbasid Caliphate 

 In 763 Al-Mansur sent his troops to conquer Al-Andalus for the Abbasid empire. But the ruler Abd al-Rahman I successfully defended his territory. Al-Mansur withdrew and thereafter focused his troops on holding the eastern part of his empire on lands that were once part of Persia.
 January 21 – Battle of Bakhamra: The Abbasid army under Isa ibn Musa defeats the Alids, and puts an end to their rebellion. The power of the Abbasid Dynasty is consolidated.

 Asia 
 February 17 – An Lushan Rebellion: Emperor Shi Chaoyi hangs himself to avoid being captured by Tang troops sent by the renegade Li Huaixian, ending the 7-year rebellion against the Tang Dynasty in China. 
 November 18 – Forces of the Tibetan Empire, under Trisong Detsen, occupy the Tang capital of Chang'an (modern Xi'an) for 15 days, and install a puppet emperor. Tibetans take over the horse pastures.

 Central America 
July 2 – Yax Pasaj Chan Yopaat ("Rising Sun") becomes the new ruler of the Mayan city state of Copán in Honduras after the death of Kʼakʼ Yipyaj Chan Kʼawiil, who had reigned since 749.  Yax Pasaj reigns until 810.

Births 
 Haito, bishop of Basel
 Harun al-Rashid, Muslim caliph (or 766)
 Wang, empress of the Tang Dynasty (d. 816)

Deaths 
 November 20 – Domnall Midi, High King of Ireland
 Bridei V, king of the Picts
 Fang Guan, chancellor of the Tang Dynasty (b. 697)
 Jianzhen, Chinese Buddhist monk (b. 688)
 Shi Chaoyi, emperor of the Yan (Anshi) state
 Wei Jiansu, chancellor of the Tang Dynasty (b. 687)

References